Miha Blažič may refer to:

Miha Blažič (footballer) (born 1993), Slovenian football defender
N'toko, whose real name is Miha Blažič (born 1980), Slovenian rapper